The 9×25mm Super Auto G, officially known as the 9 × 25 Super Auto G by C.I.P. and unofficially also known as the 9 × 25 Super Auto Grillmeyer, is an Austrian pistol cartridge.

The 10 mm Auto cartridge has functioned as the parent case for the 9×25mm Super Auto G, which is essentially a necked-down version of the 10 mm Auto. The 10 mm Auto cartridge case was used for this since it has the capability to operate with relative high chamber pressures for its case capacity which, combined with smaller and hence lighter bullets result in very high muzzle velocities.

History
The cartridge got C.I.P. (Commission Internationale Permanente pour l'Epreuve des Armes à Feu Portatives) certified in 1991. The 9×25mm Super Auto G is currently (2009) not commercially available and exists only as a C.I.P. datasheet. It might however still used by a few shooters who produce the cases from 10 mm Auto brass by reshaping the shoulder and neck, and handloading it with 9 mm calibre bullets.

Cartridge dimensions
The 9×25mm Super Auto G has 1.60 ml (25.0 grains)  H2O cartridge case capacity.

9×25mm Super Auto G maximum C.I.P. cartridge dimensions. All sizes in millimeters (mm).

Americans would define the shoulder angle at alpha/2 ≈ 19.9 degrees. The common rifling twist rate for this cartridge is 250 mm (1 in 9.84 in), 6 grooves, Ø lands = 8.82 mm, Ø grooves = 9.02 mm, land width = 2.49 mm and the primer type is large pistol.

According to the official C.I.P. (Commission Internationale Permanente Pour L'Epreuve Des Armes A Feu Portative) guidelines the 9×25mm Super Auto G case can handle up to 255 MPa (36,985  psi) piezo pressure. In C.I.P. regulated countries every pistol cartridge combo has to be proofed at 130% of this maximum C.I.P. pressure to certify for sale to consumers.

The American 9×25mm Dillon pistol wildcat cartridge is probably the closest ballistic twin of the 9×25mm Super Auto G. These cartridges are both necked down 9 mm variants of the 10 mm Auto cartridge though they vary dimensionally.

See also
 9×25mm Dillon
 .357 SIG

References

Pistol and rifle cartridges